Frank J. Williams (born August 24, 1940) is a former Chief Justice of the Supreme Court of Rhode Island, a notable Abraham Lincoln scholar and author, and a justice of the Military Commission Review Panel.

Biography
Frank Williams was born in Richmond, Rhode Island in 1940, ″the grandson of Italian immigrant parents.″  He graduated from Cranston East High School, Boston University and Boston University School of Law, and he received a master's degree in taxation from Bryant University.

From 1962 to 1967, he served as a captain in the U.S. Army and was stationed in West Germany and South Vietnam. His military awards include the Combat Infantryman Badge and Bronze Star Medal, three Air Medals and the Army Commendation Medal, the National Defense Service Medal, Vietnam Service Medal with two campaign stars the Republic of Vietnam Cross of Gallantry with silver citation star and Republic of Vietnam Campaign Medal for his military service.

Williams served as a delegate to the 1986 Rhode Island Constitutional Convention.

He served as town moderator of Richmond, Rhode Island, and town solicitor.  Governor Lincoln Almond appointed Williams to the Supreme Court in 1995. He was elevated to Chief Justice of the Supreme Court in 2001.

Beach access ruling
Williams ruled in a 1997 case involving public access to the Narragansett Town Beach. It had long been accepted that the Rhode Island Constitution guarantees free access to all state shorelines by means of walking along the shoreline below the high tide line (a right called "lateral access"). Activists at the Narragansett Town beach argued that this right also includes unobstructed access from the land (called "perpendicular access").

Williams sided with the Town of Narragansett, ruling in court that Rhode Island's Constitution "provides absolutely no indication that a right of perpendicular access across the property of others exists," and therefore the town was within their rights to charge an access fee. As of 2021, Narragansett Town Beach remains the only public beach in the state which charges for beach access.

Court of Military Commission Review
In 2003, President Bush appointed Williams through the Secretary of Defense to be a member of the United States Court of Military Commission Review.  As of July 2007, he replaced Griffin Bell as the Chief Judge. He served as Chief Judge of the US Court of Military Commissions until December 2009.

He was a member of the U.S. Abraham Lincoln Bicentennial Commission and was the founding chair of The Lincoln Forum, served as its chair for 23 years, and is now chairman emeritus. Williams was president of the Abraham Lincoln Association, the Lincoln Group of Boston, and currently serves as president of The Ulysses S. Grant Association. In 2010, Williams was elected to the board of the Abraham Lincoln Bicentennial Foundation. Justice Williams is an Associate Companion of the Military Order of the Loyal Legion of the United States, an organization founded by Union officers who served during the American Civil War, and is also a Veteran Companion of the Military Order of Foreign Wars. Williams was inducted as a Laureate of The Lincoln Academy of Illinois and awarded the Order of Lincoln (the State's highest honor) by the Governor of Illinois in 2009 as a Bicentennial Laureate.

Later career
Frank J. Williams stepped down from the Rhode Island Supreme Court at the end of December 2009 and has lectured at several universities and institutes, most notably at the New Hampshire Institute of Politics at Saint Anselm College. Williams is also an accomplished amateur chef, having appeared as a guest on the cooking show, Ciao Italia, with Mary Ann Esposito.

Awards 
Frank J. Williams  was inducted as a Laureate of The Lincoln Academy of Illinois and awarded the Order of Lincoln (the State's highest honor) by the Governor of Illinois in 2009 as a Bicentennial Laureate. In 2005, Williams received The Lincoln Forum's Richard Nelson Current Award of Achievement.

References

External links
Official Secretary of State site
Interview with Justice Williams about his life and literary work (the Exacting Editor)

Booknotes interview with Williams on Judging Lincoln, November 10, 2002.

1940 births
Living people
Boston University alumni
Rhode Island Republicans
Boston University School of Law alumni
American people of Italian descent
Chief Justices of the Rhode Island Supreme Court
United States Army personnel of the Vietnam War
United States Army officers
People from Richmond, Rhode Island
Historians of Abraham Lincoln
Judges of the United States Court of Military Commission Review